Gray Glacier is a glacier in the Cobham Range, Antarctica. It was named by the Holyoake, Cobham, and Queen Elizabeth Ranges party of the New Zealand Geological Survey Antarctic Expedition (1964–65) for M. Gray, postmaster and assistant radio officer at Scott Base, 1965.

References

Glaciers of Oates Land